Ammathi is a small town in Kodagu district of Karnataka state in India.

Ammathi 
Ammathi is located between Siddapura and Virajpet towns of Kodagu district.

Demographics
The people of this town speak Kodava, Kannada and Malayalam.

References

Villages in Kodagu district